= S. S. Khandare =

Indian police officer

- Police career
- Country: India
- Allegiance: Indian Police Service
- Department: Ladakh
- Status: Union Territory Police Chief
- Rank: Inspector General of Police
- Badge no.: 19951062

S. S. Khandare is an Indian Police Service officer of 1995 batch, who is currently serving as head of police of Ladakh.

== Career ==
Khandare graduated from Govt College of Engineering, Pune in 1992.

He was appointed as the first head of police of Ladakh when Ladakh became a union territory on 31 October 2019.

== See also ==
- Director general of police
